The 2021 NRLW premiership was the fourth professional season of Women's rugby league in Australia. The season was planned to start in August 2021, postponed to October 2021 and further postponed to 2022 due to the ongoing COVID-19 pandemic.

The competition was held from February to April 2022, with the 2022 NRL Women's season later commencing in August 2022.

Teams 
For the first time there will be three new teams in the competition: the Parramatta Eels, Gold Coast Titans and Newcastle Knights will all join the competition, while  the New Zealand Warriors will be in recess for this season due to the COVID-19 pandemic.

Teams for the Round 1 matches on Sunday, February 27 were announced on February 22, 2022.

Win/loss table 

Bold – Home game  Italics – Game played at neutral venue
Opponent for round listed above margin

Home and away season 
* Note all games are played in 2022 NOT 2021 due to the COVID-19 pandemic
* All times AEDT
Source:

Round 1

Round 2

Round 3

Round 4

Round 5

Ladder

Ladder progression 

Numbers highlighted in green indicate that the team finished the round inside the top four.
Numbers highlighted in blue indicates the team finished first on the ladder in that round.
Numbers highlighted in red indicates the team finished last place on the ladder in that round.

Finals series 
On 25 March 2022 it was announced that both NRLW semi-finals will be held at Leichhardt Oval on Sunday, 3 April 2022. At the conclusion of Round 5 on 27 March the semi-finalists, match-ups and playing order were all confirmed.

Grand Final

Team of the Week 
At the conclusion of each round, the media department of the NRL announce a team of the week. Thirteen players  equivalent to the number of players on the field for one team  are named.

Dream Team 
In the week between the Semi-finals and Grand Final, the Rugby League Players Association announced a Dream Team. The team was selected by the players, who each cast one vote for each position.

Individual awards

Dally M Medal Awards Night 
The following awards were presented at the Dally M Medal Awards ceremony in Brisbane on the night of 7 April 2022.

Dally M Medal Player of the Year: Tied
 Millie Boyle ( Brisbane Broncos); and
 Emma Tonegato ( St George Illawarra Dragons)

Captain of the Year: Brittany Breayley-Nati ( Gold Coast Titans)

Coach of the Year: Jamie Soward ( St George Illawarra Dragons)

Try of the Year: Shaniah Power for  Gold Coast Titans versus Brisbane Broncos (19 March 2022).

Tackle of the Year: Emma Tonegato for  St George Illawarra Dragons on Jessica Sergis of the Sydney Roosters (26 March 2022).

Grand Final Day Awards 
The following awards were presented at Redcliffe, Queensland on Grand Final day, 10 April 2022.

Veronica White Medal: Karina Brown ( Gold Coast Titans)

Karyn Murphy Medal Player of the Match: Sarah Togatuki ( Sydney Roosters)

RLPA Players' Champion Awards 
The following awards were voted for by NRLW players at the end of the season.

The Players' Champion: Emma Tonegato ( St George Illawarra Dragons)

Rookie of the Year:  Destiny Brill ( Gold Coast Titans) 

Dennis Tutty Award: Ali Brigginshaw ( Brisbane Broncos)

Statistical Awards 
Highest Point Scorer in Regular-season: Lauren Brown ( Brisbane Broncos) 34 (17 g)

Top Try Scorers in Regular-season: 4  Madison Bartlett ( St George Illawarra Dragons), Emily Bass ( Brisbane Broncos), Teagan Berry ( St George Illawarra Dragons), Shenae Ciesiolka ( Brisbane Broncos), and Hagiga Mosby ( Brisbane Broncos).

Highest Point Scorer across the Full Season: Lauren Brown ( Brisbane Broncos) 38 (19 g)

Top Try Scorer across the Full Season: Madison Bartlett ( St George Illawarra Dragons) 6

Club Awards

Players

Brisbane Broncos 
The team was coached by Kelvin Wright. Jumper numbers in the table below are those assigned to be used in the Semi-finals.

Notes:
 Amy Turner was selected in the 2007 Australian Jillaroos team that played two Test Matches against New Zealand Māori women's rugby league team, however, the lists of players that took the field in those matches are yet to be confirmed by the contributor to this page.
 Nakita Sao played for  Wests Panthers and later  North Sydney in the 2021 state competitions of, respectively, Queensland and New South Wales.
 Nakita Sao also played for Wests Panthers ( 4 m 1t) in the Queensland's Under 19 club matches in 2021.
 In 2021, Sara Sautia played for Canterbury Bulldogs ( 8 m 2t) played in Tarsha Gale Cup Under 19 matches in New South Wales and subsequently played for  Wests Panthers in the senior state competition in Queensland.

Gold Coast Titans 
The team was coached by Jamie Feeney. Jumper numbers in the table are those assigned to be used in the Semi-finals.

Notes:
 Crystal Tamarua has played three matches for the Cook Islands and four matches for the Kiwi Ferns.
 Cobie-Jane Morgan was selected in the 2015 New South Wales women's rugby league team.
 The following players participated in Queensland's Under 19 club tournament in 2021: Destiny Brill (West Panthers  4 m 2t), Jetaya Faifua (Burleigh Bears  4 m 1t ), April Ngatupuna (Wests Panthers  4 m 4t), Hailee-Jay Ormond-Maunsell (Burleigh Bears  4 m 4t ), Jasmine Peters (Mackay  1 m 2t), Tiana Raftstrand-Smith (Burleigh Bears  1 m 2t)
 In 2021, Georgia Hale played in both Queensland and NSW state senior competitions for, respectively, the Tweed Head Seagulls ( 7 m 1t) and North Sydney Bears ( 4 m).

Newcastle Knights 
The team was coached by Casey Bromilow. Jumper numbers in the table are those assigned to be used in Round 5.

Notes:
 Caitlan Johnston was injured in the first match and did not play again in the season.
 Maitua Feterika has played one match for the Samoa women's national rugby league team in 2011 and, subsequently, eleven matches for the Kiwi Ferns.
 Kayla Romaniuk ( 6 m) and Kyra Simon ( 6 m) played for Newcastle in the 2021 Tarsha Gale Cup for Under 21s.

Parramatta Eels 
The team was coached by Dean Widders. Jumper numbers in the table are those to be used in Round 5.

Notes:
 Maddie Studdon kicked a field goal in the Round 1 match of the 2021 NRLW season.
 In 2021, Fatafehi Hanisi played for St George ( 11 m 2t) in the Tarsha Gale Cup for Under 19s.
 Tess Stains played for Riverina and for NSW Country Origin in 2021. In 2019, Staines played for the Prime Minister's XIII.

St. George Illawarra Dragons 
The team was coached by Jamie Soward.Jumper numbers in the table are those assigned to be used in the Grand Final.

Notes:
 Natassja Purontakanen from  Valleys (9 m 1t) was signed to play in the delayed 2021 season but was injured during pre-season training and did not play.
 Emma Tonegato was selected for the New South Wales women's rugby league team in 2012 and 2013, however, the lists of players that took the field in those matches are yet to be confirmed by the contributor to this page.
 In 2021, Teagan Berry ( 9 m 11t), Keele Browne  8 m 3t), and Chantel Tugaga ( 7 m 2t) played for Illawarra in the Tarsha Gale Cup for Under 19s.
 In 2021, Tegan Dymock played for Cronulla ( 1 m) in the Tarsha Gale Cup for Under 19s.

Sydney Roosters 
The premiership winning team was coached by John Strange.Jumper numbers in the table are those that were used in the Grand Final.

Notes:
 Zahara Temara kicked a field goal in the Round 4 match of the 2021 NRLW season.
 Brydie Parker was selected in the extended squad of the New South Wales women's rugby league team in 2020 and 2021, but did not play in either match.
  In 2021, Keilee Joseph ( 8 m 3t), Otesa Pule ( 11 m 10t) and Taneka Todhunter ( 11 m 6t) played for the Indigenous Academy Sydney Roosters in the Tarsha Gale Cup for Under 19s.

References

External links 
 

2021 NRL Women's season
2021 in women's rugby league
2021 in Australian rugby league
2021 in New Zealand rugby league
Rugby league events postponed due to the COVID-19 pandemic